The New Zealand cricket team toured England in the 1978 season to play a three-match Test series against England. England won the series 3-0 with no matches drawn. New Zealand played two matches in The Netherlands on their way home.

One Day Internationals (ODIs)
England won the Prudential Trophy 2-0.

1st ODI

2nd ODI

Test series summary

First Test

Second Test

Third Test

Matches in Netherlands
New Zealand won both limited overs matches.

1st match

2nd match

External sources
 CricketArchive – tour itineraries
 New Zealand in England, 1978 at ESPNCricinfo

Annual reviews
 Playfair Cricket Annual 1979
 Wisden Cricketers' Almanack 1979

1978 in New Zealand cricket
1978 in English cricket
1978 in Dutch cricket
1978
International cricket competitions from 1975–76 to 1980